Franklin Thomas Pearce (August 31, 1905 – September 3, 1950) was a Major League Baseball pitcher. He played parts of three seasons, from 1933 until 1935, for the Philadelphia Phillies. Pearce was effective as a reliever in a game played at Wrigley Field on September 12, 1933. In an afternoon game he relieved Ed Holley in the eighth inning for Philadelphia. The Phillies lost, 2–0, but the two pitchers gave up only six hits combined. Pearce died of a self-inflicted gunshot wound in 1950.

References

External links

Major League Baseball pitchers
Philadelphia Phillies players
Nashville Vols players
Buffalo Bisons (minor league) players
Baltimore Orioles (IL) players
Rochester Red Wings players
Syracuse Chiefs players
Jersey City Giants players
Montreal Royals players
Baseball players from Louisville, Kentucky
1905 births
1950 suicides
Suicides by firearm in New York (state)